Granville is a village in Licking County, Ohio, United States. The population was 5,646 at the 2010 census. The village is located in a rural area of rolling hills in central Ohio.

Granville is home to Denison University.  The village has a number of historic buildings, including Greek Revival structures like the Avery Downer House, St. Luke's Episcopal Church (1837) and others. The Buxton Inn (1812), the Granville Inn (1924), Bancroft House (1834) and Bryn Du Mansion are local landmarks.

History

Pre-Columbian cultures
Granville is the location of the prehistoric Alligator Effigy Mound, built by the indigenous people of the Fort Ancient culture, between 800 and 1200 CE, more than four hundred years before European contact.  It may be an effigy of the underwater panther featured in Native American mythology.  The mound is listed on the National Register of Historic Places.  The area is rich in evidence of indigenous cultures.  Less than five miles from the Alligator Effigy Mound are the impressive Newark Earthworks, associated with the earlier Hopewell culture of roughly 100 BCE to 500 CE.

Pioneer settlers
Granville was not settled by European Americans until 1805; the first large group of settlers were from Granville, Massachusetts, and they named the new village after their former home. The area was first surveyed by United States representatives in 1797, as land set aside by the national government for payment in land grants to veterans who had served in the Revolutionary War.

Among the earliest settlers were Theophilus Rees and Thomas Philipps. Born in Wales, they immigrated to the United States in 1795, and gradually headed west for a new life on the American frontier. They arrived in what is now Granville township in 1802, following a brief time in Philadelphia.  Other Welsh settlers followed them, leaving their heritage in numerous place names.

Early schools
Education was a pillar of early civic life. By 1820, the village's pioneer settlers built a three-story brick school house.  By the 1830s they established five schools in the growing village. As the schools were developed through the mid and late 19th century, they began to serve students from the region as well as from the village. Among those institutions were the Granville Literary and Theological Institution, the Granville Female Seminary, the Granville Episcopal Female Seminary, the Young Ladies’ Institute, the Granville Female Academy, Doane Academy (named after the second bishop of the Episcopal Church in New Jersey), and Shepardson College for Women. The seminaries generally served first as preparatory schools for college, what were later called high schools. This was a period in which girls' education was newly stressed, and the village ensured their girls could be educated. Several of these institutions later combined and developed as what is today Denison University.

Geography
Granville is located at  (40.067520, -82.512316).

The central village is situated among three prominent hills.  College Hill is to the north.  Sugarloaf is a prominent hill and park at the west end of Broadway.  Mt. Parnassus is another prominent hill and residential area at the east end of Broadway.  A short distance south of the village center is the Raccoon Creek flood plain with the creek running from the west to east.

Education

Village schools
Granville's public schools are operated by the Granville Exempted Village School District.  The system includes, Granville High School, Granville Middle School, Granville Intermediate School and Granville Elementary School.  The high school's graduating class of 2014 included 220 students. The district receives strong performance rankings from the Ohio Department of Education Located in the village is the Granville Christian Academy serving K-12 students.  Also, there are several private preschools.

Denison University
On a hill overlooking the village is the campus of Denison University, founded in 1831 as the Granville Theological and Literary Seminary, originally a northern Baptist institution. Today, Denison is a private, residential, non-sectarian liberal arts college with a student body of about 2,100 and a faculty of 200. The school is accredited by the Higher Learning Commission and is certified by the Ohio Board of Regents to grant Bachelor of Arts, Bachelor of Science and Bachelor of Fine Arts degrees. 74% of the student body comes from out of state, including representatives from forty countries. The Homestead at Denison University is a residential student intentional community focusing on environmental sustainability.  Swasey Chapel is the iconic campus structure.  Completed in 1924, the chapel is named in honor of Ambrose Swasey, a benefactor to the college and prominent Cleveland inventor and businessman.

The history of Granville has been interwoven with that of the college for nearly two centuries. Denison faculty and staff make up an important segment of the village's population, and student patronage is central to many village businesses. Granville residents may take advantage of many university facilities, such as the athletic center, free of charge. The college has recently embarked on a number of in-town purchases, including the Granville Golf Club and the Granville Inn.

Religion

Churches occupy prominent positions at the center of the village and in the life of the community.  At the intersection of Broadway and Main Street are located the First Presbyterian Church, Centenary United Methodist Church, St. Luke's Episcopal Church and the United Church of Granville (UCC).  Nearby are Pilgrim Lutheran Church and St. Edward's Catholic Church.  Also, located in the village are Spring Hills Baptist Church, a meetinghouse of the Church of Jesus Christ of Latter-day Saints, a Kingdom Hall of Jehovah's Witnesses, Union Station Community Church and Bethel Apostolic Church.

Granville has a long history of being home to the administrative center of the American Baptist Church in Ohio.  Formerly known as the Ohio Baptist Convention, the American Baptist Churches of Ohio's office remains located in the village.  Denison University was founded as a Baptist college and had a long association with the church.  Like other Ohio independent colleges founded in the nineteenth century by religious denominations, the significance of Denison's church affiliation faded and today the university is a non-sectarian institution.

Demographics

2010 census
As of the census of 2010, there were 5,646 people, 1,441 households, and 1,017 families living in the village. The racial makeup of the village was 91.9% White, 2.1% African American, 0.1% Native American, 3.6% Asian, 0.6% from other races, and 1.7% from two or more races. Hispanic or Latino of any race were 2.7% of the population.

There were 1,441 households, of which 36.8% had children under the age of 18 living with them, 59.3% were married couples living together, 7.9% had a female householder with no husband present, 3.4% had a male householder with no wife present, and 29.4% were non-families. 25.2% of all households were made up of individuals, and 11.6% had someone living alone who was 65 years of age or older. The average household size was 2.52 and the average family size was 3.05.

The median age in the village was 22 years. 18.1% of residents were under the age of 18; 38.7% were between the ages of 18 and 24; 12.1% were from 25 to 44; 21.4% were from 45 to 64; and 9.6% were 65 years of age or older. The gender makeup of the village was 46.3% male and 53.7% female.

2000 census
As of the census of 2000, there were 3,167 people, 1,309 households, and 888 families living in the village. The population density was 790.4 people per square mile (304.9/km2). There were 1,384 housing units at an average density of 345.4 per square mile (133.3/km2). The racial makeup of the village was 96.75% White, 0.69% African American, 0.28% Native American, 1.01% Asian, 0.16% from other races, and 1.11% from two or more races. Hispanic or Latino of any race were 1.14% of the population.

There were 1,309 households, out of which 33.4% had children under the age of 18 living with them, 60.4% were married couples living together, 6.3% had a female householder with no husband present, and 32.1% were non-families. 28.5% of all households were made up of individuals, and 12.3% had someone living alone who was 65 years of age or older. The average household size was 2.42 and the average family size was 3.00.

In the village, the population was spread out, with 27.0% under the age of 18, 4.4% from 18 to 24, 25.2% from 25 to 44, 28.8% from 45 to 64, and 14.7% who were 65 years of age or older. The median age was 42 years. For every 100 females there were 94.5 males. For every 100 females age 18 and over, there were 87.7 males.

The median income for a household in the village was $67,689, and the median income for a family was $102,885 . Males had a median income of $72,250 versus $46,484 for females. The per capita income for the village was $39,221. About 3.9% of families and 3.8% of the population were below the poverty line, including none of those under age 18 and 4.8% of those age 65 or over.

Notable people

 Hubert Howe Bancroft, an American historian and ethnologist
 Ernest DeWitt Burton, an American biblical scholar and president of the University of Chicago
 Paul Carpenter, a minor league baseball player
 Edward Andrew Deeds, inventor and industrialist
 Edmund Burke Fairfield, American minister, educator and politician in the U.S. state of Michigan.
 Lottie Estelle Granger, educator
 Marie Harf, political commentator for Fox News, former Senior Advisor for Strategic Communications to U.S. Secretary of State
 Ellen Hayes, astronomer and mathematician
 Woody Hayes, a graduate of and football coach for Denison University, before leaving to coach at Ohio State University
 George Jones, co-founder of the New York Times
 Rob Mounsey, composer and arranger
 Lea Ann Parsley, Olympic silver medalist in the women's skeleton at the 2002 Winter Olympics
Marcus Aurelius Root, leading daguerreotypist and author
Alan Schaaf, founder of Imgur, an image sharing website and 2006 graduate of Granville High School
 Brian Unger, named one of Entertainment Weekly'''s "100 Most Creative People in Entertainment" in 1998 and host of the show How the States Got Their Shapes appearing on The History Channel.
 Willard Warner, a brigadier general in the Union Army during the American Civil War
 Lee Wells, contemporary fine artist and curator
 Scott Wiper, writer and director

Points of Interest
 The largest book in Ohio is hanging outside the Readers' Garden Bookstore
 Denison University campus
 The Homestead at Denison University intentional & sustainable community
 Avery-Hunter House & Robbins Hunter Museum
 Granville Historical Society
 Historic Houses of Granville, self-guided tour
 Sugarloaf Park, Opera House Park & other local parks 
 Alligator Effigy Mound
 Newark Earthworks
 Thomas Evans Trail & Bikeway
 Lake Hudson, seasonal swimming, picnicking, camping & fishing
 Polo games at Bryn Du
 Blackhand Gorge State Nature Preserve
 Dawes Arboretum
 Cranberry Bog at Buckeye Lake

See also
Granville Sentinel

References

Further reading
 Granville: The Story of an Ohio Village, William T. Utter, 1956
 Wild Turkeys and Tallow Candles, Ellen Amanda Hayes, 1920
 Denison: The Story of an Ohio College, G. Wallace Chessman, 1957
 The Historical Times'', newsletter of the Granville Historical Society

External links
 
 http://www.granvilleoh.com

Villages in Licking County, Ohio
Villages in Ohio
1805 establishments in Ohio